The false tomodon snake (Tachymenis trigonatus) is a genus of snake in the family Colubridae. and is part of the 36 species of the Tachymenini 

The false tomodon snake is a viviparity animal of about 450 millimeters long and can be seen on the western and southern regions of the Monte Desert

It is endemic to western Argentina.

Characteristics

The false tomodon snake is characterized by its coloration and number of scales. As part of the Tachymenis genus, it has morphological characters of maxillary teeth with grooved fangs, vertical pupils and symmetric nasal and anal scales.

The false tomodon snake has 8 or fewer maxillary teeth with a distinguishing yellow line present along its dorsal with specifically 19 dorsals in its midbody.

References 

Colubrids
Reptiles described in 1873
Reptiles of Argentina
Snakes of South America